"The Monsters Are Due on Maple Street" is episode 22 in the first season of the American television anthology series The Twilight Zone. The episode was written by Rod Serling, the creator-narrator of the series. It originally aired on March 4, 1960 on CBS. In 2009, TIME named it one of the ten best Twilight Zone episodes.

Opening narration

The narration continues after the neighbors wonder if what flew overhead was a meteor.

Plot
Maple Street is full of children playing and adults talking when a shadow passes over, accompanied by a roar and a flash of light. Everyone notices, but they assume that it is a meteor and quickly resume their activities. The residents soon discover that their power went off, affecting stoves, lawnmowers, cars, phones, even portable radios. They gather in the street to discuss the situation. Pete Van Horn, hammer slung in his bib overalls, volunteers to walk over to Floral Street, the next street over, to see if it is affected as well. His neighbors, Steve Brand and Charlie Farnsworth, decide to go into town, but Tommy, a neighborhood boy, urges them not to go. Tommy has read a story of an alien invasion causing similar issues, and says that the monsters do not want anyone to leave the street. Tommy adds that in the story, the aliens are living as a family that appears to be human but who are actually scouts, and the power outage that they cause is meant to isolate the neighborhood. The adults are incredulous, assuring him that the cause is natural.

Another resident, Les Goodman, tries unsuccessfully to start his car. As he is walking over to join the other residents, the car starts by itself. This, coupled with the fact that Les didn't rush outside when things started, makes the neighbors suspect that Les may be an alien. Charlie says Les had always been an oddball, and suggests they go over and investigate, while Steve urges them to be calm and not act like a mob. As they all gather, one woman brings up Les' late nights spent standing in the garden looking up at the sky, as if waiting or looking for something. Les, defending himself as a resident of Maple Street for five years, claims to suffer from insomnia, admonishes his neighbors that they should take caution and not panic. Steve tries to defuse the situation and prevent it from becoming a witch-hunt, but tensions remain high.

As darkness descends, Charlie begins keeping watch over Les Goodman's house. Steve suggests Charlie go home and go to bed. Another neighbor, Don, mentions that Steve has built a ham radio, which Charlie then claims no one has ever seen. Steve sarcastically confirms this, but only manages to make matters worse. Steve and the other neighbors continue to argue, using each person's idiosyncrasies as evidence that they are an alien. Steve warns that such behavior, looking for a scapegoat, is the surest way for the entire neighborhood to "eat each other up alive."

A shadowy figure is seen walking toward them. Tommy exclaims that it is the monster. Claiming it may be necessary for protection, Don obtains a shotgun which Steve quickly confiscates. As the figure gets closer, Charlie panics, grabs the shotgun, and, after the figure is revealed to be carrying a hammer, shoots the figure. When the crowd reaches the fallen figure, they realize it is Pete van Horn, and he is now dead. As Charlie struggles to defend his hasty action, the lights in his house come on. Les and Don voice suspicions that Pete had discovered evidence that Charlie is an alien, and he shot Pete to prevent exposure. Charlie makes a run for his house; everyone chases him, throwing stones, one of which smashes a window, causing the broken glass to fly at Charlie's face, cutting his forehead. Terrified, Charlie attempts to deflect suspicion onto Tommy. While his mother is quick to defend him, several neighbors agree with this idea, as Tommy was the only one who knew about the aliens' plans. Steve continues to try to defuse the situation, but no one listens.

Lights begin flashing on and off in houses throughout the neighborhood; lawnmowers and car engines start and stop for no apparent reason. The mob becomes hysterical, hurling accusations, smashing windows, and taking up weapons as the situation devolves into an all-out riot. Meanwhile, at a nearby hilltop, an alien spaceship and its crew are watching the riot on Maple Street while using a device to manipulate the neighborhood's power. They comment on how simply fiddling with consistency leads people to descend into paranoia and panic, and that this is a pattern that can be exploited. They also discuss their intention to use this strategy to conquer Earth, one neighborhood at a time. They then ascend a stairway into their spaceship.

Closing narration

Production
The aliens are wearing uniforms left over from the 1956 science fiction film Forbidden Planet. Also, the mockup set of the retractable stairway, leading into the lower half of the C-57D cruiser from the same film, is reused for this scene. At the end of the episode, a stock footage effects-shot of the cruiser in space can be seen (the same shot was also used in "Third from the Sun"). This technique was also used in "To Serve Man". The cruiser is shown upside down when compared to its orientation in Forbidden Planet.

2003 remake
A 2003 remake of the episode was produced for the 2002 revival of The Twilight Zone, but it was renamed "The Monsters Are on Maple Street". Serling received "Story By" credit. It starred Andrew McCarthy as Will Marshall and Titus Welliver as Dylan. The difference between the two is that the remake is more about the fear of terrorism. When the power surge happens in the remake, it is caused not by aliens, but instead by the government, specifically the United States Army, experimenting on how small towns react to the fear of terrorism. In the end, the neighborhood takes out its anger and frustration on a family who never left their house after the power surge occurred, thinking that they caused it since they still have power. The residents all fail the test miserably as did all the other inhabitants of every other street they tested.

The opening and closing narration, provided by Forest Whitaker, has also been altered:

With the closing narration being:

Other media
A radio dramatization of this episode was produced in the mid-2000s as part of The Twilight Zone radio series, starring Frank John Hughes as Steve Brand. It was included in The Twilight Zone: Radio Dramas – Collection 12 collection.

A graphic novel version was published by the Savannah College of Art and Design partnered with Walker & Co. A short-story version was published in Stories from The Twilight Zone and ends with a race of two-headed aliens moving into Maple Street.

The episode served as a major influence on science fiction in the decades that followed. Among the films that drew their inspiration from this episode include The Trigger Effect, directed by David Koepp, and The Mist, directed by Frank Darabont.

See also
Cold War
Crowd psychology
McCarthyism
Second Red Scare (1947–57)

References

Further reading

External links

The Twilight Zone (1959 TV series season 1) episodes
Crowd psychology
1960 American television episodes
Works about McCarthyism
Television episodes written by Rod Serling